Opsibidion albifasciatum is a species of beetle in the family Cerambycidae. It was described by Giesbert in 1998.

References

Neoibidionini
Beetles described in 1998